Letnitsa is a village in Dragoman Municipality, Sofia Province, western Bulgaria.

References

Villages in Sofia Province